Tamworth Speedway were a British motorcycle speedway team who operated at three venues between 1932 and 1950. During the years of league competition they were based at Tamworth Greyhound Stadium, Fazeley, near Tamworth.

History
Speedway in Tamworth began in 1932 at two venues; Mile Oak Speedway on Sutton Road, Mile Oak and on Tamworth Road, Fazeley. Both were just open meetings and no league team was formed. The Mile Oak circuit was 360 yards and began on 28 March 1932.

In 1947, Tamworth entered a speedway team in the leagues for the first time. They were known as the Tamworth Hounds and finished fifth in the 1947 Speedway National League Division Three. After a slight improvement in 1948 (4th) and 1949 (3rd) they began the 1950 season with a new name of Tamworth Tammies.

The 1950 season would be their last, with the team finishing sixth in the 1950 Speedway National League Division Three but reaching the Division three Knockout Cup final, losing to Oxford Cheetahs in the final.

Season summary

Notable riders
Eric Boothroyd

References

Defunct British speedway teams